Break the Silence is the fourth studio album by the German a cappella metal band van Canto, released on 23 September 2011.  It reached number 23 in the German charts.  It features 13 tracks, five of them being covers, and two of them featuring guest artists: Joakim Brodén (from Sabaton) guest appears in his band's cover "Primo Victoria", Marcus Siepen (from Blind Guardian) guest appears on "Spelled in Waters". "A Storm to Come" is their longest song to date, clocking at 9:13, and is also the first episode of "Peer Returns", Van Canto's theatrical a cappella metal adaption of "Peer Gynt".

Critical reaction
Metal.de rated it 9/10.  The Age of Metal called it a "jewel", praising its production and innovation. Metal Storm rated it 8.4/10. Laut.de was less complimentary, suggesting it would be better not to break the silence and calling it "as unnecessary as a goiter".

Track listing

Personnel
Van Canto
Dennis Schunke (Sly) – lead vocals
Inga Scharf – lead vocals (effects)
Stefan Schmidt – lower rakkatakka vocals, wahwah solo guitar vocals (rhythm, lead on solos)
Ross Thompson – higher rakkatakka vocals (lead)
Ingo Sterzinger (Ike) – lowest dandan vocals (bass)
Bastian Emig – drums, piano on "Master of the Wind"
Guest musicians
Joakim Brodén (Sabaton) - male vocals on "Primo Victoria"
Marcus Siepen (Blind Guardian) - acoustic guitars on "Spelled in Waters"
Orchestra on "Betrayed"
Helen Vogt (Flowing Tears) - female vocals on "A Storm to Come"

References

2011 albums
Napalm Records albums
Van Canto albums